Murilo Henrique Pereira Rocha (born 20 November 1996), known as Murilo or Murilo Henrique, is a Brazilian footballer who plays for Suwon FC as a midfielder.

Career

Career statistics

References

External links

1994 births
Living people
Brazilian footballers
Brazilian expatriate footballers
Association football midfielders
Campeonato Brasileiro Série A players
Campeonato Brasileiro Série B players
Campeonato Brasileiro Série D players
K League 1 players
Goiás Esporte Clube players
Associação Atlética Aparecidense players
Clube Atlético Linense players
Associação Atlética Ponte Preta players
Grêmio Esportivo Novorizontino players
Botafogo Futebol Clube (SP) players
Jeonbuk Hyundai Motors players
Suwon FC players
Expatriate footballers in South Korea
Brazilian expatriate sportspeople in South Korea
Footballers from São Paulo